Partner is a 2007 Indian Hindi-language romantic comedy film directed by David Dhawan and produced by Sohail Khan. The film stars Govinda, Salman Khan, Lara Dutta and Katrina Kaif. The story of Partner was copied from the 2005 American film Hitch. 

The film revolves around a love guru, who gives wooing advice and ideas to his client for the latter's ladylove, and also himself falls in love with a widowed mother. Partner was released in worldwide cinemas on 20 July 2007. It received a highly positive response, with particular praise for its comedy scenes and Govinda's performance. A critical and commercial blockbuster, Partner collected  worldwide and was one of the highest-grossing Bollywood films of 2007.

Dhawan has expressed interest in creating a sequel to the film, but as of 2022 no script had been finalized and news outlets have reported that the film has been shelved entirely.

Plot
Prem is a Love Guru who solves the love issues of his clients. He meets Bhaskar Diwakar Chaudhary who comes to Prem for help in his love life. Bhaskar loves his boss, Priya Jaisingh, but is unable to express his love to her as she is the daughter of a wealthy businessman, Raj Jaisingh. Prem initially refuses to help Bhaskar and goes to Phuket, Thailand. Bhaskar follows him there and convinces him to help.

After returning from Thailand, Prem meets Naina, a photojournalist who was running from some gangsters led by Chhota Don, who mimics Shahrukh Khan in Don. Prem saves her and falls in love with her. Meanwhile, he starts teaching Bhaskar how to impress Priya. But Bhaskar uses his own simplicity and nonsense acts to impress Priya, who finally falls in love with Bhaskar but does not disclose it to him. Meanwhile, Prem learns that Naina has a son named Rohan from her previous marriage, and to impress Naina, he takes care of him.

Bhaskar reveals to Prem that Priya will marry someone according to Raj's will. They both come to Priya's wedding ceremony with Rohan, but find Naina there and Rohan convinces her to marry Prem while Raj is convinced by Bhaskar. Priya now prepares to marry Bhaskar.

Meanwhile, a spoilt brat named Neil Bakshi comes to Prem for help and he asks Prem to convince a girl to have a one-night stand. Prem gets angry with Neil and tells him that he does not help people with such bad intentions. Neil somehow manages to get his one-night stand and then ditches her, telling her the love guru gave him the advice to do so. Unfortunately, the girl turns out to be Naina's friend Nikki. Naina then sets out to expose Love Guru and finds out that it is Prem. Naina hates Prem for what she thought he did to her friend and publishes a front-page article claiming that Prem can set anyone up with the girl they want using the Priya-Bhaskar relationship as an example. Bhaskar is fired from his job as a result.

Prem thinks that Bhaskar may kill himself without Priya and goes to her to tell her what really happened. Priya realizes that all the things she liked about Bhaskar are what Prem wanted Bhaskar to hide from her and Priya is ready to take Bhaskar back. Prem makes up with Naina by making her hear the truth about him not helping Neil, and they get back together. On both couples' honeymoon night, Bhaskar again asks Prem for help but this time they both get mingled with their respective wives.

Cast
 Govinda as Bhaskar Diwakar Chaudhary, a nerdy man who has a crush on his boss Priya Jaisingh
 Salman Khan as Prem Kulkarni a.k.a. Love Guru, a love master who advises those needing help to start a relationship
 Lara Dutta as Naina Sahani, a photo journalist who Prem falls in love with
 Katrina Kaif as Priya R. Jaisingh, Bhaskar’s boss and love interest
 Tiku Talsania as Naina's boss
 Ali Haji as Rohan Sahani, Naina's son from her previous marriage 
 Dalip Tahil as Raj Jaisingh, a wealthy businessman who is also Priya's father and also approves of Bhaskar's relationship with her
 Aarti Chabria as Nikki, Naina's colleague
 Rajat Bedi as Neil Bakshi, a spoiled brat who tries to get Prem to help him set up a one-night-stand with Nikki but is rejected by him
 Suresh Menon as Kiran            
 Deepshikha Nagpal as Pramita "Pammi" Kulkarni Purohit, Prem's sister
 Ali Asgar as Naina's colleague
 Atul Parchure 
 Vindu Dara Singh as Chadha
 Razak Khan as John Uncle
 Puneet Issar as Rana
 Shashi Kiran as a Newspaper Stall Owner    
 Dheirya Sorecha as Pammi's son
 Chinky Jaiswal as Pammi's daughter
 Sohail Khan in a photographic appearance as Sameer Purohit, Pammi's husband
 Jason Shah as Priya's fiancé
 Rajpal Yadav as Chhota Don
 Kavish Majmudar

Soundtrack

The music was composed by Sajid–Wajid. The soundtrack entered the top five on 23 July 2007. According to the Indian trade website Box Office India, with around 18,00,000 units sold, this film's soundtrack album was the year's third highest-selling.

Track list

Reception

Box office
Box Office India declared the film a "Blockbuster" and was the second biggest domestic opener at that time. It grossed Rs. 1.03 billion in India and $4.19 million overseas.
Review-Taran Adarsh 
Review- Rediff 

Review - Rajeev Masand

Accolades
2008 Zee Cine Awards

 Won: Zee Cine Award for Best Actor in a Supporting Role - Male - Govinda

9th IIFA Awards

 Nominated: Best Film - Sohail Khan
 Nominated: Best Director - David Dhawan
 Nominated: Best Actor - Salman Khan
 Won: Best Comedian Actor - Govinda

Legal issues

Copyright Infringement Lawsuit
Sony Pictures, owners of the film Hitch, contemplated a $30-million suit against both the Indian producers for copyright infringements. It would have been the second time after Begunah an international film company took legal action against an Indian entertainment company for plagiarism. Partner was eventually released, with Sony acquiring the world exclusive satellite broadcasting rights. The film had a television premiere on Sony Max in late October 2007.

A decade later April 2018, Partner was acquired by Zee Entertainment Enterprises as part of its programming and branding overhaul.

References

External links
 

2007 films
Films shot in Dubai
2000s Hindi-language films
Indian remakes of American films
Films directed by David Dhawan
Films involved in plagiarism controversies